The following is a list of Nippon Professional Baseball players with the last name starting with C, retired or active.

C
Alex Cabrera
Jolbert Cabrera
Mike Campbell
Ozzie Canseco
Esmailin Caridad
Dan Carlson
Buddy Carlyle
Giovanni Carrara
D. J. Carrasco
Héctor Carrasco
Mark Carreon
Lance Carter
Carlos Castillo
Wes Chamberlain
Chih-Chia Chang
Robinson Checo
Wei-Yin Chen
Wen-bin Chen
Chien-ming Chiang
Scott Chiasson
Hideki Chiba
Isao Chiba
Shigeru Chiba
Atsuhiro Chihara
Masashi Chikazawa
Shyoshi Chiyomaru
Sung-min Cho
Minchol Chon
Min-Tae Chung
Archi Cianfrocco
Phil Clark
Darnell Coles
Terry Collins
Scott Coolbaugh
Scott Cooper
Bryan Corey
Steve Cox
Joe Crawford
Doug Creek
Felipe Crespo
Warren Cromartie
D. T. Cromer
Iván Cruz
Rafael Cruz
Darwin Cubillán
Chris Cumberland

References

External links
Japanese Baseball

 C